Tele Images Productions (formerly Tele Images Kids) was a French television production company established in 2001 by Groupe Tele Images that produces children's television programs in animation and live-action. It has been part of Zodiak Kids Studios since 2015. 
It shut down in 2016, after Zodiak Kids merged with Banijay Group, who now owns the rights to the studio's entire catalogue.

List of films and series
 Adi in Space
 Adi Under the Sea
 Atomic Betty
 Candid Kids
 Children's Dreams
 Cities of God
 Cliff Hanger
 
 Cousin William
 Eckhart
 The Fruitties
 Hell of a Girl
 Highlander: The Animated Series
 If I Were an Animal...
 Jules Verne's Amazing Journeys
 Kelly
 Kids World Sport
 Lilli's Island
 Lou-Lou and Other Wolves
 Love in Question
 Lupo Alberto
 Michael Strogoff
 My Animal Dictionary
 Nature's Treasure Chest
 Noah's Kids
 Norman Normal
 Ocean Girl
 Pirate Islands
 Quasimodo
 Sally Bollywood: Super Detective
 Seaside Hotel
 Skippy: Adventures in Bushtown
 Soldier's Tale
 Spaceship Earth
 Street Football
 Tales of the Tooth Fairies
 Team SOS
 The Broca Street Tales
 The Children of Toromiro
 The Eye of the Wolf
 The Gifts Collection
 The Little Flying Bears
 The Longhouse Tales
 The New Adventures of Skippy
 The Search for the World's Most Secret Animals
 The True Meaning of Crumbfest
 The Wonderful World of Animals
 Thunderstone
 Tricks and Tactics
 Waldo's Way
 Weird Monsters
 Zoe and Charlie
 Zoolympics
 Baskup Tony Parker

Banijay
French animation studios
Television production companies of France